First Meeting: Live in London, Volume 1  is an album by saxophonist Lee Konitz, pianist Dan Tepfer, bassist Michael Janisch and drummer Jeff Williams. It was released on Whirlwind Recordings on 10 June 2014.

Track list

 Billie’s Bounce
 All The Things You Are
 Stella By Starlight
 Giant Steps
 Body and Soul
 Alone Together
 Subconscious Lee
 Outro (Sweet & Lovely)

Credits
 Lee Konitz – alto & soprano saxophones
 Dan Tepfer – piano
 Michael Janisch – double bass
 Jeff Williams – drums
 Recorded live on May 19 & 20th, 2010 at the Pizza Express Jazz Club in Soho, London by Luc Saint-Martin
 Produced by Michael Janisch & Lee Konitz
 Mixed and mastered by Tyler McDiarmid, NYC, Jan 2014
 Executive producer – Michael Janisch

References

2014 albums
Lee Konitz live albums